Dəlləkli is a village and municipality in the Yardymli Rayon of Azerbaijan. It has a population of 556.

References

Populated places in Yardimli District